Felice Mariani (born 8 July 1954) is an Italian politician and former judoka who competed in the 1976 Summer Olympics and in the 1984 Summer Olympics.

References

External links
 
 

1954 births
Living people
Italian male judoka
Olympic judoka of Italy
Judoka at the 1976 Summer Olympics
Judoka at the 1984 Summer Olympics
Olympic bronze medalists for Italy
Olympic medalists in judo
Medalists at the 1976 Summer Olympics
Judoka of Fiamme Gialle
20th-century Italian people
21st-century Italian people